Mambaí is a city in eastern Goiás state, Brazil. It is the easternmost city in that state.

History
The settlement began in the 19th century when settlers from the state of Bahia came looking for rubber produced by the mangabeira tree.  The village that appeared took the name Riachão.  After the building of a chapel and the passing of muleteers heading to Bahia the settlement began to grow. Soon the name was changed to Mambaí and it became a district of the municipality of Posse.  The origin of the name is unknown. In 1958 it was dismembered from Posse and became an autonomous municipality.

Geography
Mambaí is one of the most isolated cities in the state of Goiás. It lies in the Vão do Paranã statistical micro-region less than 20 kilometers from the border with the state of Bahia. It is 61 kilometers to the main interstate highway, the BR-020, which links Brasília to Salvador. It is 250 kilometers to Brasília. The distance to the state capital of Goiânia is 512 kilometers. Municipal boundaries are with Posse, Buritinópolis, Damianópolis, and the state of Bahia.  Highway connections from Goiânia are made by taking BR-153 / Anápolis / Alexânia / BR-060 / Planaltina / Formosa / BR-020 / Simolândia / GO-236.

Demographics
The population decreased 8.37.% from 1991 to 1996 and continued the decline from 1996 to 2000 with -4.02.%. In 1980 the population was 5,125 so in twenty-five years the increase has been negligible.

Economy
The economy was mainly based on agriculture, with extensive cattle raising occupying most of the territory. Most inhabitants were employed in small retail units, government jobs, and modest industrial transformation units. There were no banking institutions reporting in August 2007.

The cattle herd was small compared to other municipalities in the state. In 2006 there were 7,900 head. The number of milk cows—480—was one of the smallest in the state. The main agricultural products in planted area were corn, sugarcane, beans, manioc, and rice.

Motor vehicles: 328 (automobiles and pickup trucks)
Number of inhabitants per motor vehicle: 20

Agricultural data 2006
Farms:  392
Total area:  27,399 ha.
Area of permanent crops: 62 ha.
Area of perennial crops: 1,047 ha.
Area of natural pasture:  15,174 ha.
Area of woodland and forests:  97,327 ha.
Persons dependent on farming:  1,200
Cattle herd:  7,900
Main crop:  rice and corn with 320 hectares each

Health and education
In 2006 there were 6 schools and 01 hospital with 18 beds.
The infant mortality rate was 34.8 in 1,000 live births in 2000.
The adult literacy rate was 75% in 2000, the lowest in the state.
In 2000 Mambaí was ranked 234 out of 242 municipalities in the state of Goiás on the United Nations Human Development Index with a score of 0.647.  Nationally it was ranked 3,816 out of 5,507 municipalities.

Tourism

Places to visit 
1.Cachoeira do Funil
 Hiking Trails
Amazingly, you can stroll through the cave beneath the falls. You may even rappel from the top of the waterfall and use a pendulum to swing under the water. There are wonderful places to take a pleasant bath and get a water massage above the waterfall. A lovely location to spend an hour. You may take a beautiful stroll through a lovely forest to get to the falls, but you can also enter the cave, which involves some work, especially climbing down to reach the entrance. A good headlight is essential in the cave. One of the pleasures of our vacation to Mamba was this visit.I definitely recommend it, and the view of the fall from the cave is worth the effort.

2.Caverna Lapa do Penhasco
 Caverns & Caves
Fantastic location for recharging energy! I advise wearing light clothing and sneakers for the moderate to strenuous trail. For extremely young children up to roughly 8 years old, I believe it to be a risky ride. a river that is running, a water crossing, and many stones. Absolutely worth it!

3.Cachoeira do Alemão
 Waterfalls
You must down a very steep slope to reach this waterfall, but once you do, you'll want to remain. The waterfall is really attractive, and the pleasant water temperature helps to relieve stress and fatigue. Don't pass it up!

4.Trilha Itaguassu
 Hiking Trails
You can get a sense of Mamba's natural richness by walking this trail. The uphill and downhill path is extremely lovely as it passes beneath some really large trees. The highlight was traversing the cave, cut by a river, to continue our journey, as shown on the photo. There are places to rest and go swimming, and the water was incredibly clear. The cave and the surrounding area have some gorgeous and intriguing rock formations. Due to the variety of shapes, vegetation, and colours, the trail continues through a labyrinth of rocks that is also quite attractive. The entire trail is a half-day and requires some work, but it is worthwhile because of the stunning scenery and enjoyable swimming spots. You do require a map!

5.Caverna Claraboia
 Caverns & Caves
If you visit Mambai, don't miss it. The cave is just stunning! We have the option of rappelling down to enter the cave through a hole in the ceiling. I done that, and I suggest doing it!

Gypsy Community
There is a small gypsy community living in the area, which was the study of a linguist, Fábio José Dantas Melo, from the University of Brasília. Professor Melo carried out a study on the dialect spoken by these Gypsies.

See also
 List of municipalities in Goiás

References

Frigoletto
Transporte

Municipalities in Goiás
Populated places established in 1958
1958 establishments in Brazil